Orna Guralnik (born 1964)  is a Jewish American-Israeli psychologist and psychoanalyst most known for her role in the TV series Couples Therapy.

Early life 
Guralnik is the daughter of Nehama and Daniel Guralnik who worked together at the Israeli Embassy in Washington, D.C.. When Guralnik was two her father, an aeronautical engineer, received a job offer and the family moved to Atlanta for five years until moving again to Tel Aviv when she was seven. She describes her parents as identified with a secular, Socialist and Zionist identity.

Guralnik remembers the conflict in her parent's marriage as being very influential on her. Her mother had found success working at the Tel Aviv Museum of Art and Guralnik notes how the marriage went "through a rearrangement of a very patriarchal understanding of their marriage to a more feminist one".

At the age of sixteen, Guralnik had begun to act out and her parents negotiated with her to see a therapist.

Before pursuing psychology, she had interests in dance, studying under Rina Schenfeld and also studied film at Tel Aviv University. Eventually in 1990, she moved to New York City and began studying Psychology at Yeshiva University.

Career 
She has published on a range of subjects including Depersonalization and Self-harm. She helped found a centre for studying depersonalization and dissociation at Mount Sinai Medical School.

She describes her approach to couples therapy as drawing from Systems theory which sees the relationship as an interconnected entity rather than two separate individuals.

In 2019 she was asked by Josh Kriegman, Elyse Steinberg and Eli Despres to act as the couples therapist for Showtime's Couples Therapy alongside her supervisor Virginia Goldner. For this role she was nominated for Female Star of the Year in the 2nd Critics' Choice Real TV Awards. Each series is filmed over 20 weeks which she completes alongside her psychoanalytic practice. In 2021 she appeared in an advert for Userway.

Personal life 
Guralnik is a mother to two children, Jasper and Ruby. She has a Alaskan Klee Kai named Nico.

References

External links 

 

American women television personalities
Jewish psychoanalysts
Israeli women academics
1964 births
Living people